WAWC (103.5 FM) is a radio station broadcasting a country music format. Licensed to Syracuse, Indiana, United States, the station is currently owned by Kensington Digital Media of Indiana, L.L.C., and features programming from Compass Media Networks and Westwood One.

Prior to becoming Willie 103.5 at the end of 2006, the station had been known as Hoosier 103.5 which featured pop and rock, Indiana high school and college sports broadcasts and morning show entertainment.

References

External links

AWC
Kosciusko County, Indiana